Hamilton Insane Asylum was a psychiatric hospital in Hamilton, Ontario. The asylum was opened in 1876 and moved some patients from the Toronto Asylum.

Structures
Century Manor is a historic structure built in 1884 and the only remaining element of the asylum.  The Victoria Gothic building on 500 acres property that remained in use until the 1980s.  The other buildings were Orchard House and the Barton Building

Originally called East House, it served various roles:
 Home to treatment program for alcoholics
Forensic psychiatry program
 School and treatment program for adolescents

It was briefly a museum, but it closed in 1995 and has since become vacant.  All the other buildings relating to the asylum have been demolished and remains under provincial ownership.

See also
 Margaret and Charles Juravinski Centre

References

Hospitals in Hamilton, Ontario
Defunct hospitals in Canada
Mental health organizations in Canada
Hospitals established in 1876
Hospitals disestablished in 1995